Walter Augustus Drake (21 February 1879 – 27 January 1941) was a New Zealand rugby union player. A loose forward, Drake represented  at a provincial level between 1898 and 1902. He played just one match for the New Zealand national side, against the touring New South Wales team at Athletic Park, Wellington in 1901. He later served as a Canterbury selector, and was a New Zealand selector in 1923.

Drake died in Christchurch on 27 January 1941, and was buried at Linwood Cemetery.

References

1879 births
1941 deaths
Rugby union players from Christchurch
People educated at Christchurch Boys' High School
New Zealand rugby union players
New Zealand international rugby union players
Canterbury rugby union players
Rugby union flankers
New Zealand sports executives and administrators
Burials at Linwood Cemetery, Christchurch